Arena is a 1989 American science fiction action film  directed by Peter Manoogian and starring Paul Satterfield and Claudia Christian. Set in 4038,  Satterfield plays Steve Armstrong, the first human in 50 years to compete in the intergalactic boxing sport called simply "The Arena". The film was produced by Irwin Yablans and features original music by Richard Band.

Plot
Steve Armstrong works as a short order cook on a space station somewhere in the galaxy. Overwhelmed by the volume of orders, he repeatedly fouls up and soon finds himself in a confrontation with an alien patron named Vang. After a fight which smashes up the diner and leaves the alien injured, Steve and his friend and co-worker Shorty are fired. As it turns out, Vang is an Arena fighter, and his manager Quinn confronts Steve. Amazed that a human could beat one of her best fighters, Quinn offers him a contract, but convinced that humans no longer have a place in the Arena, Steve refuses, intending to make his way back to Earth.

Lacking sufficient money for a ticket, Shorty attempts to raise the cash by gambling in an underground casino. The game is raided by the authorities and in the confusion, Shorty pockets the money. Caught in the act by crime boss and top Arena fight manager Rogor and his enforcer Weezil, Shorty is held for ransom. Steve promises to pay off the debt, so he reluctantly returns to Quinn and agrees to a contract with her, using the money to free Shorty. Remarkably Steve wins his first match with an alien named Sloth in an upset. After seeing Steve's potential, Rogor attempts to contract Steve as his Arena fighter but learns Steve has already signed with Quinn. Steve continues fighting, determined to prove that a human has what it takes to be champion, and soon becomes a top contender.

Rogor becomes worried that his high position in Arena fighting could be jeopardized if Steve wins the championship, so he enlists his consort Jade to seduce Steve and poison him the night before the championship fight with Rogor's top fighter, an alien cyborg named Horn. But medics are able to counteract the poison minutes before the fight, and Steve appears in the Arena surprising Rogor and Jade. Rogor then resorts to Weezil's plan of hacking into the computer controlling the handicap technology used to ensure fair fights. Weezil's accomplice, Skull, successfully interfaces with the computer located in the catwalk high above the Arena and gains control of the handicap, causing Steve to be severely impaired during the second round of the fight with Horn. Shorty quickly suspects foul play and leaves to investigate, finding Weezil and Skull in the computer room. While fighting off Weezil, Shorty damages part of the computer which in turn causes Skull's head to explode. With the handicap computer offline Steve regains his full abilities and ultimately defeats Horn, becoming the first human champion in one thousand years.

Cast
 Paul Satterfield as Steve Armstrong, Young human fighter who wants to break into the alien fighting arena game.
 Hamilton Camp as Shorty, A family man from Nebulos who befriends Steve, seems to have contacts all over the underworld of the station.
 Claudia Christian as Quinn, Manager of a small ring of fighters she inherited from her father.
 Marc Alaimo as Rogor, Casino owner, manager of Horn, and all around underworld boss.
 Shari Shattuck as Jade, Night club singer and Rogor's woman.
 Armin Shimerman as Weezil, Rogor's enforcer.
 Brett Porter as Wayne
 Charles Tabansi as Troy
 Michael Deak as Horn, Rogor's top fighter, an extremely violent and arrogant cyborg alien.
 Jack Carter as Announcer
 William Butler as Skull, A high strung-cybernetic alien always looking to make a quick buck.
 Grady Clarkson as Commissioner Dent
 Dave Thompson as Doctor
 Ken Clark as Marcus Diablo, The last human Arena champion, now homeless, living in the tubes of the space station.
 Diana Rose as Space Lady In Nightclub

Reception 
Lawrence Cohn of Variety called it "an above-average fantasy".  Michael Weldon wrote in The Psychotronic Video Guide to Film, "If you liked TV shows like Battlestar Galactica, you might make it through this juvenile, PG-13, science fiction comedy from Charles Band."

See also
 Arena (short story)
 Arena (Star Trek: The Original Series)
 Fun and Games (The Outer Limits)
 List of sports films
 List of films featuring space stations

References

External links

1989 films
1989 independent films
1989 science fiction films
Fiction set in the 5th millennium
American independent films
American science fiction horror films
Puppet films
Italian independent films
Italian science fiction horror films
1980s English-language films
Empire International Pictures films
Films directed by Peter Manoogian
Films produced by Irwin Yablans
Films scored by Richard Band
1980s American films
1980s Italian films